All on the Red is a 1968 Italian crime-thriller film written and directed by Aldo Florio and starring Brett Halsey.

Plot

Cast 
 Brett Halsey as Mike Chapman 
  Barbara Zimmermann as   Belinda Duval 
 Piero Lulli as  Laszlo
 José Greci as  Yvette 
 Gordon Mitchell as  Erikson
 Franco Ressel as  Reikovic 
 Vladimir Bacic as  Tankovic
 Antonio Nalis as Mark
  as Tacci
  Gianni Solaro as  Marello

References

External links

1960s Italian-language films
Italian crime thriller films
1960s crime thriller films
1960s Italian films